CBY is a clear-channel public radio station in Corner Brook, Newfoundland and Labrador.  It is owned by the Canadian Broadcasting Corporation and it carries the CBC's Radio One network.  The transmitter is off the Trans-Canada Highway near Massey Drive in Corner Brook.

CBY is a Class A station, transmitting with 10,000 watts, using a non-directional antenna. By day, the signal covers most of Western Newfoundland. At night, with a good radio, it can be heard around the Maritime Provinces and parts of Quebec and New England.  Nine FM rebroadcasters provide additional coverage throughout Western Newfoundland and the Northern Peninsula.

History
Before Newfoundland joined the Canadian Confederation in 1949, Newfoundland radio stations had call signs beginning with VO. Thus, what is now CBY was launched with the call sign VOWN, standing for the Voice of West Newfoundland, on July 5, 1943 during a public ceremony attended by about two hundred guests in the ballroom of the Glynmill Inn. The broadcast opened with a rendition of Ode to Newfoundland played by the Corner Brook Militia Band, followed by a recorded address from Sir Humphrey Walwyn, Governor of Newfoundland.

The station originally broadcast on a frequency of 840 kHz and was owned by the Broadcasting Corporation of Newfoundland. Following a power increase from 250 watts to 1,000 watts on March 23, 1947, the station began broadcasting on 790 kHz. 

On March 31, 1949, the Broadcasting Corporation of Newfoundland was absorbed by the Canadian Broadcasting Corporation when Newfoundland joined Canada. Consequently, VOWN adopted its present call sign. In 1963, the station began broadcasting on 990 kHz.

CBNA St. Anthony signed on the air on August 2, 1969 at 600 kHz, but has since moved to 100.3 FM.

On October 19, 2012, CBY made its final broadcast from its longtime studios of 53 years on Premier Drive in Corner Brook after the announcement of budget cuts by the federal government. The station is now located in the Valley Mall, a decision that drew much criticism mostly because of the size of the new studios. The former CBC location was a building, owned and operated by the CBC.

The call sign CBY was previously used by a CBL rebroadcaster in Toronto from 1938 to 1943.

Local programming
Since 2018, CBY has cooperated with CBG in Gander to produce CBC Newfoundland Morning, a local morning show focused on central and western Newfoundland, the Northern Peninsula, and southern Labrador. Prior to this, CBY produced its own morning show called The West Coast Morning Show.

For the remainder of local programming blocks within the CBC Radio One schedule, CBY broadcasts programming from CBN in St. John's.

Transmitters

On May 27, 1986, the CRTC approved the CBC's application to change CBNE from 1370 to 1420 kHz. CBNE was later converted to 91.9 MHz on February 15, 1989.

On February 5, 2018, the CRTC approved the CBC's application to convert CBNA 600 to 100.3 MHz with an effective radiated power of 4,500 watts (non-directional antenna with an effective height of the antenna above average terrain of 173 metres). The licensee also stated that the new FM transmitter will reach a greater population than the existing AM signal.

References

External links
CBC Newfoundland and Labrador
 

BY
BY
Radio stations established in 1943
Clear-channel radio stations